Hyalodiscus is an extant genus of diatom known also from the fossil record.

References

Diatom genera
Prehistoric SAR supergroup genera
Taxa named by Christian Gottfried Ehrenberg